Tanner Leissner (born September 17, 1995) is an American professional basketball player for EWE Baskets Oldenburg of the German Basketball Bundesliga. He played college basketball for the New Hampshire Wildcats.

College career
Leissner was a four year starter for the New Hampshire Wildcats. As a freshman, he led the team with 12.3 points and 7.2 rebounds per game and was named the America East Conference Rookie of the Year and second team all-conference. He led the team in scoring and finished as the Wildcats' second-leading rebounder with 15.9 points and 7.3 rebounds per game as a sophomore and was named first team All-America East. Leissner was again named first team all-conference in his junior after averaging 17.1 points and 6.9 rebounds and helped lead New Hampshire to the semifinal of the 2017 America East men's basketball tournament. As a senior, he led the Wildcats for a fourth straight year with 18.7 points per game while also averaging 6.9 rebounds per game. He was named first team All-America East for a third consecutive season and awarded UNH Athlete of the Year. Leissner finished his collegiate career as the Wildcats' all-time leader in points (1,962), free throws attempted (675) and made (521), and minutes played (4,095) while also finishing third in rebounds with 862 in 121 games played.

Professional career

Ehingen Urspring
Leissner signed with Ehingen Urspring of ProA, the German second division, to start his professional career. He finished the ProA season with 16.3 points and 5.4 rebounds over 33 games (32 starts).

Hapoel Be'er Sheva
Following the end of the ProA season, Leissner signed with Hapoel Be'er Sheva B.C. of the Israeli Basketball Premier League on April 28, 2019. Leissner averaged 9.0 points, 3.4 rebounds and 2.4 assists in seven games for the team.

MHP Riesen Ludwigsburg
Leissner returned to Germany after signing with MHP Riesen Ludwigsburg of the Basketball Bundesliga (BBL) on August 2, 2019. He averaged 10.2 points and 4.1 rebounds per game in the Bundesliga.

Afyon Belediye
On August 1, 2020, he signed with Afyon Belediye of the Turkish Basketbol Süper Ligi.

Rytas Vilnius
On August 3, 2021, he has signed with Rytas Vilnius of the Lithuanian League.

EWE Baskets Oldenburg 
On July 14, 2022, he signed with EWE Baskets Oldenburg of the German Basketball Bundesliga.

References

External links
New Hampshire Wildcats bio
RealGM profile
EuroBasket profile

1995 births
Living people
Afyonkarahisar Belediyespor players
American expatriate basketball people in Germany
American expatriate basketball people in Israel
American men's basketball players
Basketball players from Texas
Ehingen Urspring players
EWE Baskets Oldenburg players
Hapoel Be'er Sheva B.C. players
Judson High School alumni
New Hampshire Wildcats men's basketball players
People from Bexar County, Texas
Riesen Ludwigsburg players